David McKenzie (15 July 1936 – 10 August 1981) was an Australian fencer. He competed at the 1956, 1960 and 1964 Summer Olympics. He was an International Olympic Committee member from 1974 to 1981. He replaced Lewis Luxton who had resigned. McKenzie gained notoriety for encouraging Dennis Tutty to go to court to challenge rugby league's restraint of trade clauses, a case that would change professional sport in Australia. </ref>

References

External links
 

1936 births
1981 deaths
Australian male fencers
Olympic fencers of Australia
Fencers at the 1956 Summer Olympics
Fencers at the 1960 Summer Olympics
Fencers at the 1964 Summer Olympics
Sportspeople from Sydney
Australian International Olympic Committee members
Australian Olympic Committee administrators
Australian sports executives and administrators
International Olympic Committee members
Commonwealth Games medallists in fencing
Commonwealth Games silver medallists for Australia
Fencers at the 1962 British Empire and Commonwealth Games
20th-century Australian people
Medallists at the 1962 British Empire and Commonwealth Games